Who's Landing in My Hangar? was the 1981 debut studio album by American rock band Human Switchboard. It was voted the 11th best record of the year in The Village Voices annual Pazz & Jop poll of American critics.

Track listing
All songs written by Bob Pfeifer, except where noted.

Side one
"(Say No To) Saturday's Girl"  – 3:50 (Bob Pfeifer / Myrna Marcarian)
"Who's Landing in My Hangar?"  – 2:38
"In This Town"  – 3:15
"No Heart"  – 3:16
"Refrigerator Door"  – 7:30

Side two
"I Can Walk Alone" – 3:02 (Bob Pfeifer / Myrna Marcarian)
"(I Used To) Believe in You"  – 3:57
"Don't Follow Me Home"  – 4:33
"Book on Looks"  – 2:35
"Where the Light Breaks"  – 3:53

Personnel
Robert “Bob” Pfeifer  -  vocals, guitar
Myrna Marcarian  - Farfisa organ, vocals
Ron Metz - drums
Steve Calabaria  - bass
Doug Morgan - bass
Paul Hamann - bass

References 

Who's Landing in My Hangar?
I.R.S. Records albums
Human Switchboard albums